KZAZ (91.7 FM) is a radio station licensed to Bellingham, Washington. The station is owned by Washington State University, and airs Northwest Public Broadcasting's news and talk and classical music programming.

History

KZAZ signed on in 1991 as an independent public radio station serving Bellingham, owned by Northern Sound Public Radio. KZAZ had been delayed nearly 18 months in signing on the air from its planned May 1990 launch due to a series of issues, one of which was the incorrect placement of its antenna on the tower. Additionally, the new station was seeking federal grant money at the same time as more visible community organizations, such as the local United Way. Broadcasting then as now with just 120 watts to protect allocations to Canada, KZAZ maintained NPR and American Public Radio affiliations. Washington State University merged with Northern Sound Public Radio, structured as a transaction in which WSU bought KZAZ for $60,000, in 1997.

In August 1996, KZAZ had applied to build a new FM station in Mount Vernon, also at 91.7 FM, to expand its coverage area. This application would prove particularly useful for Washington State University. Also in Mount Vernon was Skagit Valley College's KSVR, then at 90.1 FM and causing co-channel interference to KNWP, the Northwest Public Radio transmitter at Port Angeles. In May 2000, Northern Sound offered to transfer the 91.7 construction permit to Skagit Valley College to move KSVR there and solve the interference problem. The original KSVR license was then transferred to Washington State and relaunched as NWPR transmitter KMWS in November 2002, at which time the KSVR intellectual unit moved to 91.7.

Popular Culture-
A KZAZ TV is mentioned in the dancing scene of the popular movie based on the musical Grease.

References

External links

ZAZ (FM)
ZAZ
Classical music radio stations in the United States
NPR member stations
1992 establishments in Washington (state)
Radio stations established in 1992